Polygyros (Greek: Πολύγυρος) is a town and municipality in Central Macedonia, Greece. It is the capital of Chalkidiki.

Geography

Polygyros town (pop. 6,121 at the 2011 census) is built in the shape of an amphitheatre on a plateau on the south west side of the mountain Cholomontas. It is south of Greek National Road 16 (Thessaloniki - Arnaia). Polygyros is located SE of Thessaloniki, NE of Nea Moudania, NW of Sithonia and SW of Arnaia. The municipal unit (the municipality before 2011) has a population of 10,721 inhabitants and a land area of 470.933 km2. Other large villages in the municipal unit are Kalýves Polygýrou (1,333), Ólynthos (1,111), Taxiárchis (903), and Vrástama (700).

Climate
Polygyros has a temperate climate with relatively cold winters and pleasant summers due to its elevation.

Name
There are different speculations about the origin of Polygyros' name. Some claim that it comes from the combination of poly (much) and geros (strong), because of the healthy climate. Also an old landowner, named Polyaros, offers a possible etymology. According to another possible etymology, the name derives from poly and gyros (round), possible due to the town's amphitheatric position.

Municipality
The municipality Polygyros was formed at the 2011 local government reform by the merger of the following 4 former municipalities, that became municipal units:
Anthemountas
Ormylia
Polygyros
Zervochoria

The municipality has an area of 947.417 km2, the municipal unit 470.933 km2.

History

Antiquity
Some situate in the broader area of modern Polygyros the ancient city of Apollonia. Apollonia was one of the 32 cities, which, under the leadership of the Olynthus, constituted the Koinon ton Chalkideon (Chalkidian League). The Koinon was destroyed in 379 BCE by the Spartans, while in 348 BCE Philipp II of Macedon annexed the whole Chalcidice into the Macedonian Kingdom. In 168 BCE Chalcidice was subjected by the Romans.

Byzantine and Ottoman Era

The town of Polygyros is first mentioned in a medieval imperial document, chryssovoulon (with golden stamp), of Eastern Roman Emperor Nikephoros III Botaneiates about 1080 CE. In 1430, as the rest of the Eastern Roman Empire, Polygyros was conquered by the Ottomans and belonged to the Sanjak of Thessaloniki. On 17 May 1821 the people of Polygyros rose against the Ottoman authority and managed, temporarily, to expel the Ottoman guard. Polygyros, such as other villages of the peninsula, were burned by the Ottomans.

Many residents of Polygyros also took part in the 1854's unsuccessful revolutionary movement against the Ottomans.

Modern Era
Finally, on November 2, 1912 the Greek army, as one of the victors of the First Balkan War, entered Polygyros and incorporated the town in the Greek State.

Culture
Polygyros is famous for its carnival celebrations, which attracts visitors from all over Greece. A nearby location called Panagia (Virgin Mary) is the setting of a famous religious celebration on August 15. Also, cultural societies are active in the fields of folk music and dance. Classic and modern music is cultivated in the municipal conservatory. There is a Folklore Museum in the town, opened in 1998.

Sports
Niki (victory) is the name of Polygyros' football club, which participates in the Greek National Fourth Division Professional League. AOP (Athletic Club of Polygyros) is the local basketball team, participant in the Third National Basketball Division.

Landmarks
The Archaeological Museum of Polygyros has exhibits containing findings from all over Halkidiki and referring to paleolithic and neolithic age, geometric, archaic, classic, hellenistic and Roman period. 
Archaeological Museum of Polygyros

Historical population

People
Margaritis Schinas, politician
Christos Zabounis, editor

See also
List of settlements in Chalkidiki

References

External links

Official website 
Official website of the Prefecture of Chalkidiki

Municipalities of Central Macedonia
Greek prefectural capitals
Populated places in Chalkidiki